Bedlam in Paradise is a 1955 short subject directed by Jules White starring American slapstick comedy team The Three Stooges (Moe Howard, Larry Fine and Shemp Howard). It is the 162nd entry in the series released by Columbia Pictures starring the comedians, who released 190 shorts for the studio between 1934 and 1959.

Plot
On his deathbed, Shemp struggles between life and death as Moe and Larry attempt to nurse him back to health. He warns them to behave or he will return to haunt them. After Shemp's arrival to Heaven, his Uncle Mortimer (played by Moe) contemplates whether Shemp will remain or go to Hell. Then the Devil (Philip Van Zandt) appears in a burst of flame to tempt Shemp with a sultry dancer, Hellen Blazes (Sylvia Lewis). Uncle Mortimer intervenes, promising Shemp eternity in Heaven if he returns to Earth unseen and unheard and reforms Moe and Larry.

Meanwhile, one "Mr. Heller" (the Devil) is giving Moe and Larry some "devillishy good ideas," such as conning a wealthy couple into financing the production of fountain pens that write under whipped cream. Shemp sabotages their demonstration but accidentally starts a fire. The scene fades back to Shemp's bedroom. It has all been a dream, but Shemp is on fire because he fell asleep smoking in bed. When he tells Moe and Larry about their fountain pen writing under whipped cream, Moe hits him with a cream pie and gives him a pen and Larry gives him a notepaper and tells Shemp to write himself a letter ("Dear Uncle Mortimer...").

Cast

Credited
 Moe Howard as Moe, Uncle Mortimer and Heavenly Train announcer (voice)
 Larry Fine as Larry
 Shemp Howard as Shemp
 Vernon Dent as I. Fleecem (stock footage)
 Philip Van Zandt as The Devil / Mr. Heller
 Sylvia Lewis as Helen Blazes

Uncredited
 Marti Shelton as Miss Jones (stock footage)
 Judy Malcolm as Heavenly switchboard operator (stock footage)
 Victor Travers as Mr. DePeyster (stock footage)
 Symona Boniface as Mrs. DePeyster (stock footage)
 Brian O'Hara as Gunslinger (stock footage. was cameo)

Production notes
Bedlam in Paradise is a remake of Heavenly Daze, using ample stock footage. The new footage was filmed on July 9, 1954. Coincidentally, as the musical Carousel was a hit in Broadway at the time of the making of Heavenly Daze, the film version of Carousel was in production when Bedlam in Paradise was made.

A gag in the film's script called for a fountain pen to be thrown into the middle of Larry's forehead. The pen was to be thrown on a wire and into a small hole in a tin plate fastened to Larry's head. However, due to a miscalculation on the part of the special effects department, the sharp pen point punctured Larry's skin, leaving a gash in his forehead. Moe later chased director Jules White around the set because White had promised that the gag would be harmless.

See also
List of American films of 1955

References

External links 
 
 
 Bedlam in Paradise at threestooges.net

1955 films
Columbia Pictures short films
The Three Stooges films
American black-and-white films
The Three Stooges film remakes
Films about dreams
Films directed by Jules White
1955 comedy films
American slapstick comedy films
1950s English-language films
1950s American films
American comedy short films